Btourram or Bterram, Bturan, Beturan (Arabic, بطرام)  is a village in Koura District of Lebanon. The population is Greek Orthodox and other confessions.

Etymology 

The known meanings of Btourram are the following:
 in Arabic "wind of the rock" or the rocky wind.
 "bet" "tur" "ram" means "House of the High Mountain".
 “beth” “turan” means “the temple” of “Turan” or Astarte (Phoenician/Canaanite Goddess).

Local authorities 
The municipal council is formed of 12 members headed by Dr. Haytham Serhan. Board members are Mikhael Salem, Elias Malek, John Serhan, George Sarkis, Marcelle Alagha, Ghada Salem, Henri Deeb, Ziad Yazbeck, Assaad Saoud, Souhail Serhan and George Malek. The mukhtar (mayors) are Khalil Salem and Michel Deeb.

Family and education 
Bterram's family names are: Abboud, Alagha, Deab, Fellah, Jabbour, Jarjoura, 
Kalash, Khawli, Khoury, Makhoul, Mushahwar, Malek, Melki, Naser, Salem Saker, Sarkis, Serhan, Sha, 
Srour, Tannous, Yazbek, Younes...

Some of the most influential people are: Charles Malik, a philosopher and diplomat who was a leading figure in the drafting and adoption of the 1948 Universal Declaration of Human Rights and Elie Salem who held many influential political and academic positions. he was the president of the Balamand University. Btourram has two schools; Khalil Salem School and Universal School of Lebanon.

Archeology 

In archeology, Btourram is known for its middle palaeolithic site of Keoue  and an old underground sanctuary called Eshmunit. Btourram also has one church dedicated to Cosmas and Damian and one monastery dedicated to Virgin Mary. Both date from the Crusades era.

References

External links
Bterram, Localiban
 Bterram a Beautiful Village of Lebanon - Homepage official site

Eastern Orthodox Christian communities in Lebanon
Populated places in the North Governorate
Koura District